The 2012 Northeast Conference baseball tournament began on May 17 and ended on May 19 at Senator Thomas J. Dodd Memorial Stadium in Norwich, Connecticut.  The league's top four teams competed in the double elimination tournament.  Second seeded  won their second consecutive, and third overall, tournament championship and earned the Northeast Conference's automatic bid to the 2012 NCAA Division I baseball tournament.

Seeding and format
The top four finishers were seeded one through four based on conference regular-season winning percentage. Bryant was ineligible for postseason play, as it completed its transition to Division I. Sacred Heart claimed the second seed over Central Connecticut by tiebreaker.

Bracket

All-Tournament Team
The following players were named to the All-Tournament Team.

Most Valuable Player
Troy Scribner was named Tournament Most Valuable Player.  Scribner was a junior pitcher and first baseman for Sacred Heart.  Scribner allowed two runs on seven hits in a complete game victory over Central Connecticut in the first round.

References

Tournament
Northeast Conference Baseball Tournament
Northeast Conference baseball tournament
Northeast Conference baseball tournament